Charles F. Davis (1904 – q1 1967) was an English professional footballer who played as a half-back in the Football League for Torquay United, York City and Mansfield Town and in non-League football for Bath City and Glastonbury.

References

1904 births
1967 deaths
Footballers from Bristol
English footballers
Association football midfielders
Bath City F.C. players
Torquay United F.C. players
York City F.C. players
Mansfield Town F.C. players
Glastonbury Town F.C. players
English Football League players